The 2017–18 CS Universitatea Craiova season is the 66th season in the football club's history and 4th consecutive and 51st overall season in the top flight of Romanian football, the Liga I, having been promoted from the Liga II in 2014. Universitatea Craiova also are participating in this season's edition of the domestic cup Cupa României, and the UEFA Europa League. This is the 1st season for Universitatea in the rebuilt Ion Oblemenco stadium, located in Craiova, Romania. The season covers a period from 1 July 2017 to 30 June 2018.

Season overview

Background
In the previous season, Universitatea finished in the fifth position and qualified for European football for the first time since the 1992–93 UEFA Cup. They were knocked out of the Romanian Cup in the semi-finals by FC Voluntari.

July

Previous season positions

Players

Squad information

Transfers

In

Out

Overall transfer activity

Expenditure
Summer:   €229,000

Winter:   €945,000

Total:    €2,174,000

Income
Summer:   €3,400,000

Winter:   €0

Total:    €0

Net Totals
Summer:   €3,171,000

Winter:   €945,000

Total:    €2,226,000

Friendly matches

Competitions

Overview

Liga I

Regular season

Table

Results by round

Matches

Championship round

Table

Position by round

Matches

Cupa României

UEFA Europa League

Third qualifying round

Statistics

Appearances and goals

! colspan="13" style="background:#DCDCDC; text-align:center" | Players transferred out during the season
|-

|}

Goalscorers

Clean sheets

Disciplinary record

Attendances

See also

 2017–18 Cupa României
 2017–18 Liga I
 2017–18 UEFA Europa League

References

CS Universitatea Craiova seasons
Craiova, Universitatea, CS
Universitatea Craiova